Idrettslaget Stjørdals-Blink is a Norwegian sports club from Stjørdalshalsen, Trøndelag. It has sections for association football, team handball, volleyball, track and field, orienteering, cycling, swimming, gymnastics, speed skating, and Nordic skiing.

History

Establishment
It was established in 1956 as a merger between Stjørdal IL (the former AIF club Stjørdal AIL) and IL Blink. The club counts 1910 as its founding year.

Recent years
The men's football team currently plays in the 1. divisjon, the second tier of the Norwegian football league system. The club also played several seasons in the 2. divisjon during the 1990s until the relegation in 1998. Stjørdals-Blink then won its 3. divisjon group and contested play-offs to the 2. divisjon in 2000, won, but was relegated again in the following 2001 season. It won its 3. divisjon group and contested play-offs in 2004 and 2010, but failed. In 2019 Stjørdals-Blink promoted to Norwegian First Division.

Recent history 

{|class="wikitable"
|-bgcolor="#efefef"
! Season
! 
! Pos.
! Pl.
! W
! D
! L
! GS
! GA
! P
!Cup
!Notes
|-
|2009
|3. divisjon
|align=right|4
|align=right|22||align=right|12||align=right|3||align=right|7
|align=right|51||align=right|41||align=right|39
||1st qualifying round
|
|-
|2010
|3. divisjon
|align=right|1
|align=right|22||align=right|18||align=right|1||align=right|3
|align=right|81||align=right|28||align=right|55
||1st round
|Lost promotion play-offs
|-
|2011 
|3. divisjon
|align=right|2
|align=right|24||align=right|15||align=right|4||align=right|5
|align=right|90||align=right|37||align=right|49
||2nd round
|
|-
|2012 
|3. divisjon
|align=right|2
|align=right|24||align=right|18||align=right|2||align=right|4
|align=right|89||align=right|20||align=right|56
||2nd round
|
|-
|2013 
|3. divisjon
|align=right|2
| align="right" |26|| align="right" |18||align=right|2|| align="right" |6
| align="right" |81|| align="right" |48||align=right|56
|1st round
|
|-
|2014 
|3. divisjon
|align=right bgcolor=#DDFFDD| 1
| align="right" |26|| align="right" |23||align=right|0|| align="right" |3
| align="right" |136|| align="right" |20||align=right|69
|2nd qualifying round
|Promoted
|-
|2015 
|2. divisjon
|align=right |7
| align="right" |26|| align="right" |11||align=right|5|| align="right" |10
| align="right" |42|| align="right" |44||align=right|38
|2nd round
|
|-
|2016 
|2. divisjon
|align=right bgcolor="#FFCCCC"| 8
| align="right" |26|| align="right" |12||align=right|2|| align="right" |12
| align="right" |53|| align="right" |40||align=right|38
|4th round
|Relegated
|-
|2017 
|3. divisjon
|align=right bgcolor=#DDFFDD| 1
| align="right" |26|| align="right" |19||align=right|2|| align="right" |5
| align="right" |81|| align="right" |45||align=right|59
|2nd round
|Promoted
|-
|2018 
|2. divisjon
|align=right | 11
| align="right" |26|| align="right" |7||align=right|7|| align="right" |12
| align="right" |39|| align="right" |48||align=right|28
|2nd round
|
|-
|2019 
|2. divisjon
|align=right bgcolor=#DDFFDD| 1
| align="right" |26|| align="right" |18||align=right|6|| align="right" |2
| align="right" |69|| align="right" |22||align=right|60
|2nd round
|Promoted  
|-
|2020 
|1. divisjon
|align=right |14
| align="right" |30|| align="right" |8||align=right|9|| align="right" |13
| align="right" |52|| align="right" |59||align=right|33
|Cancelled
|
|-
|2021  
|1. divisjon
|align=right |14
| align="right" |30|| align="right" |8||align=right|7|| align="right" |15
| align="right" |32|| align="right" |50||align=right|31
|2nd round
|
|-
|2022
|1. divisjon
|align=right bgcolor="#FFCCCC"| 16
| align="right" |30|| align="right" |4||align=right|5|| align="right" |21
| align="right" |30|| align="right" |71||align=right|17
|2nd round
|Relegated
|}
Source:

Current squad 

For season transfers, see transfers winter 2021–22.

References

 Official website 

Football clubs in Norway
Sport in Trøndelag
Stjørdal
Association football clubs established in 1910
Athletics clubs in Norway
1910 establishments in Norway